Josh Zakim (born December 16, 1983) is a Boston politician, attorney, and community activist. He formerly served on the Boston City Council representing District 8, which includes Boston's Back Bay, Beacon Hill, Fenway–Kenmore, Mission Hill, and West End neighborhoods.

Family
Zakim is the son of Lenny and Joyce Zakim. He grew up in Newton, Massachusetts, with his two younger sisters, Deena and Shari. Zakim's father was a Jewish-American religious and civil rights leader in Boston. After his death in 1999, Boston's Leonard P. Zakim Bunker Hill Bridge was named in his honor.

Zakim is an active Board Member of the Lenny Zakim Fund. Founded in 1995 by his father and his activist friends, the Fund gives small grants to support local grassroots organizations seeking to address complex social issues such as youth violence, adult literacy, and job training.

Education
Zakim attended high school at Buckingham Browne & Nichols in Cambridge, Massachusetts. He graduated with a Bachelor of Arts degree in Political Science from the University of Pennsylvania, and went on to receive his Juris Doctor degree from the Northeastern University School of Law.  He was sworn into the Bar of the Commonwealth of Massachusetts on December 2, 2009.

Career

Zakim began his career at Greater Boston Legal Services in their Consumer Rights Unit. He then went on to join the Public Finance group of the law firm Mintz, Levin, Cohn, Ferris, Glovsky, and Popeo, where he worked on municipal bond transactions for the Commonwealth of Massachusetts, MassPort, and the MBTA.

Zakim was elected to the Boston City Council in November 2013. He served as the Chair of both the Committee on Human Rights and Civil Rights and the Special Committee on Transportation, Public Infrastructure, Planning, and Investment. Zakim was a progressive voice on the Boston City Council, with his legislative priorities centered around social and economic justice. He was re-elected without opposition in November 2015. In November 2017, he was challenged for his seat by longtime community activist Kristen Mobilia, but Zakim held his Council seat with a better than two-to-one win.

In November 2017, Zakim announced that he would run for Massachusetts Secretary of the Commonwealth in 2018, challenging incumbent and fellow-Democrat William F. Galvin. In the Democratic primary held on September 4, 2018, Zakim was defeated by Galvin, by approximately a two-to-one margin.

On March 21, 2019, Zakim announced that he would not seek re-election to the City Council in the November 2019 election.

References

Further reading

External links
 Profile at boston.gov
 Josh Zakim personal website

Living people
Boston City Council members
Jewish American people in Massachusetts politics
Lawyers from Boston
Place of birth missing (living people)
1983 births
Buckingham Browne & Nichols School alumni
Mintz Levin people
University of Pennsylvania School of Arts and Sciences alumni
Northeastern University School of Law alumni
21st-century American Jews